Abdul Rehman (born 7 August 1982) is a Pakistani professional footballer, who plays for K-Electric as a striker and winger as well. He is also a member of Pakistan national football team.

Rehman made an appearance for the Pakistan national football team in the qualifying round of the 2008 AFC Challenge Cup against Guam on 6 April 2008, coming on as a 46th-minute substitute for Adnan Ahmed and scoring the ninth goal for Pakistan on 85th minute.

International Career Stats

Goals for Senior National Team

Honours

Club
K-Electric
 Pakistan Premier League: 2014–15

References

1982 births
Living people
Pakistani footballers
Pakistan international footballers
Association football forwards